Fredrik Stang Lund (17 November 1859 – 13 June 1922) was a Norwegian politician for the Liberal Party.

He was the mayor of Oslo briefly in 1895.

On 14 October, 1895, he was appointed to the first cabinet Hagerup as both Minister of Auditing and Minister of Finance. He left the Minister of Finance post on 1 November 1895, and the Minister of Auditing post exactly one year later, only to become a member of the Council of State Division in Stockholm. On 1 August, 1897, he was appointed Minister of Labour. He held this post until 16 February, 1898, when the first cabinet Hagerup fell.

References

1859 births
1922 deaths
Government ministers of Norway
Liberal Party (Norway) politicians
Mayors of Oslo
Place of birth missing
Place of death missing
Ministers of Finance of Norway